Judson Dance Theater was an informal group of dancers who performed at the Judson Memorial Church in Greenwich Village, Manhattan New York City between 1962 and 1964. It grew out of a dance composition class taught by Robert Dunn, a musician who had studied with John Cage.  The artists involved were avant garde experimentalists who rejected the confines of Modern dance practice and theory, inventing as they did the precepts of Postmodern dance.

The first Judson concert took place on July 6, 1962.

This is a list of all artists (dance artists, musicians, visual arts) who were a part of the Judson Dance Theater between 1962 and 1966:

A

 Carolyn Adams
 Charles Adams
 Felix Aeppli
 Seth Allen
 Susie Allen
 Toby Armour
 Becky Arnold
 Styra Avins

B

 Joan Baker
 Ansel Baldonado
 Jerri Banks
 George Bartenieff
 Edward Barton
 Margaret Beals
 Judith Berkowitz
 Lori Berkowitz
 Sind Bhairavi
 Erica Bindler
 John Blair
 Carla Blank
 Joseph Bloom
 Robert Blossom
 Edward V. Boagni
 Sudie Bond
 Sally Bowden
 George Brecht
 Carolyn Brown
 Leroy Bowser
 Pearl Bowser
 Bonnie Bremer
 Edward Brewer
 Ronald Brown
 Trisha Brown
 Joseph Byrd

C

 Lucy Carmalt
 Al Carmines
 Christopher Carrick
 Janet Castle
 Diana or Diane Cernovich
 Peter Chapman
 Mark Chapnick
 Remy Charlip
 Lucinda Childs
 Carolyn Chrisman
 Nancy Christofferson
 Sheila Cohen
 Hunt Cole
 Richard Colten
 Chuck Connor
 Michael Corner
 Philip Corner
 Terry Creach
 Tina Croll
 Gretel Cummings

D

 Bill Davis
 Laura Dean
 Laura de Freitas
 Cecily Dell
 Walter De Maria
 Nanette Deminges
 George Dennison
 Pamela Denver
 Brian de Palma
 Ken Dewey
 Harry Diakoff
 Barbara Dilley
 Diane di Palma
 Bill Dixon
 Kathy Dobkin
 Johnny Dodd
 Pamela Dover
 John Dowd
 Rachel Drexler
 Jeff Duncan
 Judith Dunn
 Robert Dunn

E

 Carol Ehrlick
 June Ekman
 Larrio Ekson
 Maurice Elanc
 Michael Elias
 Frank Emerson
 Ruth Emerson
 Beverly Emmons
 Ed Emshwiller
 Joe Evans
 Jose Evans
 Abigail Ewert

F

 Joan Fairlie
 Viola Farber
 Lulu Farnsworth
 Crystal Field
 William Fields
 June Finch
 Jim Finney
 Pamela Finney
 George Flynn
 Maria Irene Fornés y Collado
 Barbara Forst
 Simone Forti
 Hollis Frampton
 Eugene Friedman
 Robert Frink
 Cynthia Full

G

 Mark Gabor
 Tom Garland
 Trudy Gertler
 Rhona Ginn
 Richard Goldberg
 Malcolm Goldstein
 Grace Goodman
 Mickey Goodman
 James Goodson
 David Gordon
 Esther Gouldin
 Frank Grady
 Marty Greenbaum
 Joe Greenstein
 Red Grooms
 Gary Gross
 Mimi Gross
 Sally Gross
 Mark Guache
 Lee Guilliatt

H

 Clinton Hamilton
 Suzushi Hanayagi
 Al Hansen
 Fred Harris
 Johnny Harris
 Walter Harris
 Mimi Hartshorn
 Deborah Hay
 Alex Hay
 Wendy Heckler
 Cynthia Hedstrom
 E. Hendrick
 Geoffrey Hendricks
 Jon Hendricks
 Donna Hepler
 Fred Herko
 Clyde Herlitz
 George Herms
 Geoffrey Heyworth
 Dick Higgins
 Irv Hochberg
 Tony Holder
 Dorothy Hoppe
 John Hoppe
 Jerry Howard
 Ka Kwong Hui
 Robert Huot
 Scott Hutton

I

 Yasuo Ihara
 Ed Iverson

J

 Mari Jackman
 Daniel Jahn
 Alex John
 Eddie Johnson
 Harold Johnson
 Karen Johnson
 Ray Johnson
 Jill Johnston
 Joe Jones
 LeRoi Jones
 Jerry Joyner
 Julie Judd

K

 Michael Katz
 Susan Kaufman
 Isamu Kawai
 Masato Kawasaki
 Elizabeth Keen
 Barbara Kendall
 Elmira Kendricks
 Ustad Ali Akbar Khan
 B. King
 Kenneth King
 Teresa King
 Barbara Kleinberg
 Billy Klüver
 Olga Adorno Klüver
 Shielah Komer
 Lawrence Kornfeld
 Takehisa Kosugi
 Judith Kummerle
 Al Kurchin
 Julie Kurnitz
 Marcia Jean Kurtz

L

 Toni Lacativa
 Pandit Chatur Lal
 Eliza Lamb
 Stephen Lamb
 Arthur Layser
 David Lee
 Deborah Lee
 Ro Lee
 Ellen Levene
 Suzanne Levine
 Ira Lieberman
 Frank Lilly
 Eugene Lion
 Victor Lipari
 Carol Lipis
 Katherine Litz
 Barbara Lloyd
 Benjamin Lloyd
 Clare Lorenzi

M

 Martha McCauley
 John Herbert McDowell
 Gretchen MacLane
 Jackson Mac Low
 Michael Malcé
 Claire Mallardi
 Castro March
 Carol Marcy
 Norma Marder
 Allen Marlowe
 Elizabeth Martin
 Paula Mason
 Jack Matlaga
 Ira Matteson
 Richard Maxfield
 Taylor Mead
 Irene Meltzer
 Annette Mendel
 Ellen Messing
 William Meyer
 Christine Meyers
 Otto Mjaanes
 Meredith Monk
 Thelonious Monk
 Peter Moore
 Charlotte Moorman
 Robert Morris
 Roger Morris
 Dorothy Moskowitz
 Elizabeth Munro
 Bill Myers

N

 Billy Name (William Linich)
 Sandra Neels
 Novella Nelson
 Max Neuhaus
 Phoebe Neville
 Peter Nevraumont
 Phil Niblock
 Sabina Nordoff

O

 Alex Ogle
 Frank O'Hara
 Edward Oleksak
 Olen Orr
 Michael Orrell

P

 Sandy Padilla
 William Pardue
 Aileen Passloff
 John Patton
 Steve Paxton
 Andrew Peck
 Richard Peppitone
 Nina Petrucelli
 Rudy Perez
 Katherine Pira
 Lauren Persichetti
 John Porche
 Lanny Powers
 Neville Powers

Q

 John Quinn

R

 Yvonne Rainer
 Ellen Rand
 Robert Ranieri
 Jerome Raphel
 Elna Rapp
 C. Rauschenberg
 Robert Rauschenberg
 Eric Regener
 Gregory Reeve
 Albert Reid
 Diana Reil
 Lucy Reisman
 Joshua Rifkin
 Dorothea Rockburn
 Richard Robbins
 Lou Rogers
 Charles Ross
 Arlene Rothlein
 Charles Rotmil
 Sheila Roy
 Arnlene Rubawsky

S

 Mark Saegers
 Mark Saffron
 Barbara Salthe
 Stan Salthe
 Marian Sarach
 Kenneth Sarch
 M. Sarakhova
 Peter Saul
 David Schiller
 Joseph Schlichter
 Beverly Schmidt
 Carolee Schneemann
 Evelyn Schneider
 Carol Scothorn
 Larry Segal or Siegal
 Valda Setterfield
 Andrew Sherwood
 Linda Sidon
 Bob Sievert
 Nanette Sievert
 James Simpson
 David Skelnik
 Jack Smith
 Michael Smith
 Sue Smith
 Gil Solomon
 SNCC
 Burt Spilk
 Malcolm Spooner
 Sally Stackhouse
 Bob Stanford
 Charles Stanley
 Polly Stearns
 Ruth Sternfeld
 Regina Stroff
 Constance Sullivan
 Carol Summers
 Elaine Summers
 K. Summers
 Burton Supree

T

 Linda Talbot
 Florence Tarlow
 Cecil Taylor
 James Tenney
 Jennifer Tipton
 Robin Toast
 Sheindi Tokayer
 Anne Tolbert
 Roy E. Towl

U

 Per Olof Ultvedt

V

 Johanna Vanderbeek
 Stan Vanderbeek
 Jack Van Osten
 Kenneth Van Sickle
 Steve Vasey
 Fred Vassi
 David Vaughan
 Jean Venable
 Charlotte Victoria
 Joanna Vischer
 Laura Vogel

W

 Marlene Wallin
 James Waring
 Glen Wayne
 Theodore Weichers
 Zena Weiss
 David Whitney
 Arthur Williams
 M. Williams
 Judith Wills
 James Wilson
 Shirley Winston
 Margaret Wise
 Philip Wofford
 Marilyn Wood
 John Worden
 John Wright
 Margaret Wright
 Vincent Wright
 Michael Wylie

X

Y

Z

 Jamil Zakkai
 Daniel Zellman
 Paul Zimet

References
Notes

Culture of New York City
Dance in New York City